The Marlowe Papers is a novel by Ros Barber published in 2012. It won the Hoffman Prize in 2011, the Desmond Elliott Prize in 2013 and was joint-winner of the Authors' Club Best First Novel Award.

The novel, written in blank verse, is a story about the English 16th century poet Christopher Marlowe, contemporary of William Shakespeare. In this tale, Marlowe's murder in 1593 is a fake and he lives on to write the plays and poems ascribed to Shakespeare.

The Desmond Elliott Prize judges called the book a "unique historical conspiracy story". According to Barber, she has encountered hostility because of the novel's Marlovian premise. She says, "It's a work of fiction. You can believe that Shakespeare of Stratford wrote the works and still enjoy it."

The book was adapted as a play by Barber and Nicola Haydn, performed by Jamie Martin in 2016.

References

Christopher Marlowe
Marlovian theory of Shakespeare authorship
Cultural depictions of writers
Cultural depictions of poets
Cultural depictions of dramatists and playwrights
Cultural depictions of British men
Novels about William Shakespeare
Novels set in the 16th century
Shakespeare authorship fiction